Max Ellis (born 29 September 1991) is a cricketer who plays for Guernsey. He played in the 2014 ICC World Cricket League Division Five tournament. In May 2015 he participated in the 2015 ICC Europe Division One tournament.

He played in the 2016 ICC World Cricket League Division Five tournament, taking 10 wickets in six matches.

References

External links
 

1991 births
Living people
Guernsey cricketers
Place of birth missing (living people)